Guardian usually refers to:
 Legal guardian, a person with the authority and duty to care for the interests of another
 The Guardian, a British daily newspaper

(The) Guardian(s) may also refer to:

Places 
 Guardian, West Virginia, United States, an unincorporated community in Webster County
 Guardian Nunatak, a landform on Antarctica's Dufek Coast
 Guardian Rock, an islet off the Antarctic Peninsula in Bigourdan Fjord
 Guardian telephone exchange, Manchester, England
 Wonder Mountain's Guardian, a roller coaster at Canada's Wonderland, Vaughan, Ontario

People 
 GuardiaN (Ladislav Kovács; born 1991), Slovak  professional video-game player
 Angel Guardian (born 1998), Filipina actress and singer
 Don Guardian (born 1953), mayor of Atlantic City, New Jersey, United States

Arts, entertainment, and media

Fictional entities

 Guardian (comics), characters from various comics
 Guardian (DC Comics), a DC Comics superhero
 Guardian (Highlander), a character in the film Highlander: The Source (2007)
 Guardian, a supercomputer in American science fiction thriller film Colossus: The Forbin Project (1970)
 Guardians, player characters in Destiny, a 2014 first-person shooter video game
 Guardians, a playable class in the game The Lord of the Rings Online
 Philosopher kings, also called Guardians, a rôle hypothesised in Plato's Republic
 The Guardian, the main and player character of The Guardian Legend, a 1988 video game
 The Guardian, an alien being in the Ultima series of role-playing video games
 The Guardians, a group of characters in the 1984 TV series Challenge of the GoBots
 Guardians, police officers in The Handmaid's Tale (TV series)

Films
 Guardian, a 2001 film directed by John Terlesky
 The Guardian (1917 film), a silent film starring Montagu Love and June Elvidge
 The Guardian (1990 film), a horror film directed by William Friedkin
 The Guardian, a 1997 television film starring Stephanie Niznik
 The Guardian (2006 film), a drama starring Kevin Costner and Ashton Kutcher
 Guardians (2012 film), a German action film
 Guardians (2017 film), a Russian superhero film
 The Guardians (2017 film), a French film directed by Xavier Beauvois
 Guardian (2021 film), a Malayalam film directed by Satheesh Paul

Games
 Guardian (1986 video game), a 1986 beat 'em up for arcades
 Guardians (card game), a collectible card game published in 1995/96
 Guardian (video game), a 1994 3D shoot 'em up for the Amiga CD32 games console
 Guardians (video game), a 1995 coin-operated arcade game

Literature
 Guardians (play), a 2005 off-Broadway stage play by Peter Morris
 The Guardian (novel), a 2003 novel by Nicholas Sparks
 The Guardian (play), a 1633 Caroline era stage play by Philip Massinger, reworked 1642 by A. Cowley
 The Guardians (Christopher novel), a 1970 novel by John Christopher
 The Guardians (Abbey novel), a 1982 novel by Lynn Abbe
 The Guardians, a series of military science fiction novels by Richard Austin
 The Guardians, a novel by Ana Castillo

Music
 Guardian (band), an American Christian hard rock/metal band
 Guardians (The Crimson Armada album), 2009
 Guardians (August Burns Red album), 2020
 "Guardian" (song), a 2012 song by Alanis Morissette from her album Havoc and Bright Lights
 Guardians Drum and Bugle Corps, a drum and bugle corp from Dallas, Texas

News and periodicals

Australia
 Daily Guardian (Sydney), a former newspaper in Sydney, Australia
 The Guardian, a bulletin of the Communist Party of Australia (1971)

Canada
 Brampton Guardian, a free, weekly community newspaper in Ontario
 Etobicoke Guardian, a weekly suburban newspaper in Toronto
 The Guardian (Charlottetown), a daily newspaper on Prince Edward Island

United Kingdom
 Guardian Media Group, owners of The Guardian , The Observer and The Guardian Weekly
 The Guardian, formerly Manchester Guardian
 theGuardian.com, online resource of The Guardian
 Cornish Guardian, a local weekly newspaper in Cornwall, England
 Farmers Guardian, a weekly newspaper aimed at the British farming industry
 Glasgow University Guardian, the student newspaper of the University of Glasgow
 Neath Guardian (published 1925–2009), a local weekly newspaper in Neath, Wales
 South Wales Guardian, a local newspaper in Ammanford, Wales
 The Guardian (1713), a London newspaper founded in 1713 and running only briefly
 The Guardian (Anglican newspaper), an Anglican newspaper founded in 1846 and running until 1951
 Local and regional newspapers published by Newsquest

United States
 Boston Guardian (published 1901–1950), an African-American newspaper in Boston, Massachusetts
 National Guardian, a New York weekly newspaper founded in 1948, renamed The Guardian in 1967 and running until 1992
 San Francisco Bay Guardian, a free alternative newspaper published weekly in San Francisco, California
 UCSD Guardian, the student newspaper at the University of California, San Diego

Elsewhere
 Ashburton Guardian, a daily, later tri-weekly, newspaper in Ashburton, New Zealand
 The Guardian (Belize), the official print organ of the United Democratic Party
 Daily Guardian (Iloilo), an English-language newspaper in Iloilo City, Philippines
 The Guardian (Nigeria), an independent daily newspaper published in Lagos, Nigeria
 The Sunday Guardian, a weekly newspaper based in New Delhi, India
 Trinidad and Tobago Guardian, a daily newspaper in Trinidad and Tobago

Television and web series

Series
 Guardian (web series), a Chinese web drama released in 2018
 Guardians Evolution, a 2014 claymation series on APTN Kids
 The Guardian (TV series), a CBS series that first aired in 2001 starring Simon Baker
 The Guardians (South Korean TV series), South Korea
 Guardian: The Lonely and Great God, South Korea
 The Guardians (British TV series), a 1971 UK television drama series

Episodes
 "Guardians" (The Walking Dead), an episode of the television series The Walking Dead
 "The Guardian" (Sliders), an episode of the television series Sliders

Visual arts
 Guardian (sculpture), a statue in Abertillery, Wales, UK
 The Guardian (sculpture), a public artwork in Redwood City, California, USA
 Guardians, artworks by American artist Kris Neely
 Guardians of Traffic, a set of statues on the Hope Memorial Bridge in Cleveland, Ohio, USA
 Wächter (Anatol) (Guardian), several monumental outdoor sculpture by Anatol Herzfeld

Businesses and organizations

Financial institutions
 Guardian Bank, Kenya
 Guardian Building Society, United Kingdom
 Guardian Capital Group, a publicly traded asset management company
 The Guardian Life Insurance Company of America, a mutual life insurance company domiciled in New York

Other businesses and organizations
 Guardian Angels, an international volunteer organization for unarmed crime prevention
 Guardian Industries, a manufacturer of glass, automotive and building products headquartered in Auburn Hills, Michigan
 Mannings, known as Guardian in Malaysia and Singapore, a health care retailer

Military

Military vehicles
 Boeing AH-64E Apache Guardian, a variant of the AH-64 Apache
 Dassault HU-25 Guardian, a modified Falcon 20 business jet formerly used by the U.S. Coast Guard
 Grumman AF Guardian, a warplane of the U.S. Navy
 HMS Guardian, three ships of the Royal Navy
 USS Guardian, three ships of the U.S. Navy

Other military uses
 Northrop Grumman Guardian, an anti-missile system for commercial airliners
 Space professionals of the United States Space Force
 Weishi Rockets, a family of Chinese multiple rocket launcher systems

Religion
 Custos (Franciscans) or Guardian, the term used in place of Religious Superior among Franciscans
 Guardian (Baháʼí Faith), a now defunct hereditary office of the Bahá'í Faith
 Guardian angel, assigned to protect and guide a particular person or group
 Guardian deity, a spirit who protects a particular place, person, culture or occupation
 Medusa (meaning "Guardian" or "Protectress"), one of the Gorgons of Greek mythology

Sports

Asia
 Fubon Guardians, a team in the Chinese Professional Baseball League (CPBL) in Taiwan
 Galle Guardians, a provincial T20 cricket team in Sri Lanka

United States
 Cleveland Guardians, a team in Major League Baseball (MLB) known as the Cleveland Indians from 1915 through 2021
 Dallas Beer Guardians, an independent supporters group of FC Dallas of Major League Soccer (MLS)
 Golden Guardians, an esports organization
 New York Guardians, an American-football team in the XFL
 San Diego Guardians, a team in The Basketball League (TBL)

Technology

 Guardian (database), an intel reporting system the FBI use to track threats
 Guardian (polymer), a substrate used in the production of polymer banknotes
 Galaxy (spacecraft), previously Guardian, a cancelled prototype space habitat

Other uses
 Guardian (fireboat), a fireboat operated in the San Francisco Bay since 1990 in reserve status
 Guardian of Scotland, the de facto head of state of Scotland during the interregnums of 1290–1292 and 1296–1306
 Guardian stones, standing stones at the corners of enclosures around a dolmen
 Guardian temperament, one of the four temperaments according to the Keirsey Temperament Sorter

See also
 
 
 Defender (disambiguation)
 Guard (disambiguation)
 Guarda (disambiguation)
 Guardia (disambiguation)
 La Guardia (disambiguation)
 The Guard (disambiguation)
 The Guardian (disambiguation)